This is a list of genera in the plant family Malvaceae, includes Alcea (hollyhock), Malva (mallow) and Lavatera (tree mallow), as well as Tilia (lime or linden tree).

A 

 Abelmoschus
Abroma Jacq.
Abutilon 
Abutilothamnus
Acaulimalva
Adansonia L. - baobabs
Aguiaria Ducke
Akrosida
Alcea
Allosidastrum
Allowissadula
Althaea
Alyogyne
Ancistrocarpus 
Andeimalva
Anisodontea
Anoda
Anotea
Apeiba 
Asterotrichion
Ayenia L.

B 

 Bakeridesia
Bastardia
Bastardiastrum
Bastardiopsis
Batesimalva
Bernoullia Oliv.
Berrya 
Billieturnera
Bombax L.
Boschia 
Brachychiton 
Briquetia
Brownlowia 
Burretiodendron 
Byttneria Loefl.

C 

Callirhoe
Calyculogygas
Calyptraemalva
Camptostemon Mast.
Carpodiptera 
Catostemma Benth.
Cavanillesia Ruiz & Pav.
Ceiba Mill.
Cenocentrum
Cephalohibiscus
Cheirolaena Benth
Chiranthodendron Larreat.
Christiana 
Cienfuegosia
Clappertonia 
Codonochlamys
Coelostegia Benth.
Cola 
Colona 
Commersonia J.R.Forst. & G.Forst.
Corchoropsis Siebold & Zucc.
Corchorus 
Corynabutilon
Craigia 
Cristaria
Cullenia

D 

Decaschistia
Dendrosida
Desplatsia 
Dicarpidium F.Muell.
Dicellostyles
Diplodiscus 
Dirhamphis
Dombeya 
Duboscia 
Durio

E 

Eleutherostylis 
Entelea 
Eremalche
Erinocarpus 
Eriolaena 
Eriotheca Schott & Endl.

F 

Fioria
Firmiana 
Franciscodendron 
Fremontodendron Coville
Fryxellia
Fuertesimalva

G 

Gaya
Gilesia F.Muell.
Glossostemon Desf.
Glyphaea 
Goethalsia 
Gossypioides
Gossypium
Grewia 
Guazuma Mill.
Guichenotia J.Gay
Gynatrix
Gyranthera Pittier

H 

Hampea
Hannafordia F.Muell.
Harmsia K.Schum.
Helicteres 
Helicteropsis
Heliocarpus 
Helmiopsiella Arenes
Helmiopsis H.Perrier
Herissantia
Heritiera 
Hermannia L.
Herrania Goudot
Hibiscadelphus
Hibiscus
Hildegardia Schott & Endl.
Hochreutinera
Hoheria
Horsfordia
Howittia
Huberodendron Ducke
Humbertianthus
Humbertiella
Hydrogaster

I - J 

Iliamna
Indagator 
Jarandersonia 
Julostylis
Jumelleanthus

K 

Kearnemalvastrum
Keraudrenia J.Gay
Kitaibela
Kleinhovia L.
Kokia
Kosteletzkya
Kostermansia 
Krapovickasia
Kydia

L 

Lagunaria (DC.) Rchb.
Lasiopetalum Sm.
Lavatera
Lawrencia
Lebronnecia
Lecanophora
Leptonychia Turcz.
Luehea 
Lueheopsis 
Lysiosepalum F.Muell.

M 

Macrostelia
Malachra
Malacothamnus
Malope
Malva
Malvastrum
Malvaviscus
Malvella
Mansonia 
Matisia Humb. & Bonpl.
Maxwellia Baill.
Megatritheca Cristóbal
Megistostegium
Melhania 
Melochia L.
Meximalva
Microcos 
Modiola
Modiolastrum
Mollia 
Monteiroa
Mortoniodendron

N 

Napaea
Nayariophyton
Neesia 
Neobaclea
Neobrittonia
Neobuchia Urb.
Neoregnellia Urb.
Nesogordonia 
Nototriche

O 

Ochroma Sw.
Octolobus

P 

Pachira Aubl.
Palaua
Pavonia
Patinoa Cuatrec.
Paradombeya Stapf
Paramelhania Arenes
Peltaea
Pentace 
Pentapetes L.
Pentaplaris L.O.Williams & Standl.
Periptera
Perrierophytum
Phragmocarpidium
Phragmotheca Cuatrec.
Phymosia
Pityranthe 
Plagianthus
Pseudabutilon
Pseudobombax Dugand
Pseudocorchorus 
Pterocymbium 
Pterospermum 
Pterygota

Q - R 

Quararibea Aubl.
Radyera
Rayleya Cristóbal
Reevesia 
Rhodognaphalon (Ulbr.) Roberty
Rhynchosida
Robinsonella
Roifia Verdc.
Rojasimalva
Ruizia Cav.
Rulingia R.Br.

S 

Scaphium 
Scaphopetalum Mast.
Schoutenia 
Scleronema Benth.
Septotheca Ulbr.
Senra
Seringia J.Gay
Sida
Sidalcea
Sidasodes
Sidastrum
Sparrmannia 
Sphaeralcea
Spirabutilon
Spirotheca Ulbr.
Sterculia 
Symphyochlamys

T 

Talipariti
Tarasa
Tetralix 
Tetrasida
Thepparatia 
Theobroma L.
Thespesia
Thomasia J.Gay
Tilia L.
Trichospermum 
Triplochiton 
Triumfetta 
Trochetia 
Trochetiopsis

U - Z 

Ungeria 
Uladendron Marc.-Berti
Urena
Vasivaea 
Waltheria L.
Wercklea
Wissadula

References

 
Malvaceae